Emilia is a Venezuelan telenovela written by Delia Fiallo and produced by Venevisión which aired it  between 1979 and 1980.

Elluz Peraza and Eduardo Serrano starred as the main protagonists.

Plot
Emilia is a young middle-class seamstress who is struggling to work hard in order to support her grandmother, her sister Nereida and her brother Chente. Emilia's family lost their vast fortune, but despite the fact that they are struggling to make ends meet, they cannot resign themselves to accept poverty, as they dream of regaining their former wealth. In the same neighborhood lives Tano, a young man who is in love with Emilia, though Emilia only views him as a friend.

Each member of her family has their own path. Her grandmother lives in a fantasy world, Chente enters the criminal world while Nereida becomes the mistress to a rich, old man called Pipo who is married to Yolanda Aguirre. It turns out that Nereida's older lover is the father of Emilia's boyfriend, Alejandro. Alejandro is a playboy who is committed to marry Marcia, a selfish and capricious woman who will try to separate him from Emilia after Alejandro leaves her in order to marry Emilia.

However, Alejandro later discovers that his father is having an affair with a younger woman, and all the evidence points to Emilia. Emilia tries to defend herself, but Alejandro does not believe her, and he breaks off their engagement. One night, drunk and angry, Alejandro comes to Emilia's house and rapes her, only to discover that she was actually a virgin. Humiliated, traumatized and left expecting a child, Emilia decides to forget Alejandro, and she will meet Dr. Maselli, her new love interest.

Cast
 Elluz Peraza as Emilia
 Eduardo Serrano as Alejandro Aguirre
 Eva Blanco as Yoli de Aguirre
 Mario Brito
 Martha Carbillo
 Hilda Carrero as Nereida
 Olga Castillo as Generosa
 Luis Colmenares as Mentepollo
 Helianta Cruz as Marcia
 Renee de Pallas as Abuela
 Elisa Escámez
 Elba Escobar as Elba
 Manuel Escolano
 Fernando Flores as Fernando
 Félix Loreto as Miguelón
 Alberto Marín as Pipo
 Yolanda Méndez
 Flor Núñez as Leticia
 Miriam Ochoa as Laurita
 Carmencita Padrón as Nina
 Tony Rodríguez as Chente
 Marcelo Romo as Dr Maselli
 Betty Ruth as Ines
 Franklin Virgüez as Tano

References

External links
 

1979 telenovelas
Venevisión telenovelas
1979 Venezuelan television series debuts
1980 Venezuelan television series endings
Venezuelan telenovelas
Spanish-language telenovelas
Television shows set in Caracas